Ralph Charles Sutherland Walker (born 2 June 1944) is a philosopher at Magdalen College, Oxford and an expert on the philosophy of Immanuel Kant.

Professional life

Walker received his secondary education at Aberdeen Grammar School, Selwyn House School and Trinity College School. He was then educated at McGill and Oxford, where he was a Rhodes Scholar at Balliol College, before entering academia as a fellow at Merton College in 1968. He moved to Magdalen in 1972, where he has worked since. From 1984–85, he served as the Junior Proctor, with disciplinary oversight for the University. From 1993–2003 he was a delegate to Oxford University Press and from 2000–2006 he was Head of the Humanities Division at Oxford, one of the most senior posts at the University. In 2009, he retired from the position of Vice-President of Magdalen College. Until his retirement from the position of Senior Tutor in Philosophy at Magdalen in 2012, he lectured in the Faculty of Philosophy, normally on Kant. Upon his retirement, he was made an Emeritus Fellow of Magdalen College.

Roger Scruton called Walker's book Kant "clear and scholarly" and the “‘positive’ rejoinder" to the “‘objective’ interpretation" of Kant's Critique of Pure Reason, The Bounds of Sense, by P. F. Strawson, who had already been at Magdalen when Walker started his work there and remained a fellow until 1987. Walker's most recent book, Kant and the Moral Law, was released in 1998 and has been translated into a number of languages. Apart from focusing on Kant, Walker has also made contributions to the Coherence Theory of Truth.

Bibliography

Books
 A Selective Bibliography on Kant. Oxford: Sub-Faculty of Philosophy, 1975. 
 Kant. London: Routledge & Kegan Paul, 1978. 
 Kant on Pure Reason. Oxford: Oxford University Press, 1982. 
 The Coherence Theory of Truth: Realism, Anti-Realism, Idealism. London: Routledge, 1989. 
 The Real in the Ideal: Berkeley's Relation to Kant. New York; London: Garland, 1989. 
 Kant: Kant and the Moral Law. London: Phoenix, 1998. 
 Finnish translation by Heikki Eskelinen: Kant : Kant ja moraalilaki. Helsinki: Otava, 2000.  
 French translation by Ghislain Chaufour: Kant.: La loi morale. Paris: Seuil, 2000. 
 Greek translation: Kant : Καντ. Enalios, 2006. 
 Hebrew translation by Orah Gringard: קאנט. Tel-Aviv: Yediʻot aḥaronot: Sifre ḥemed, 2001. 
 Polish translation by Jacek Hołówka: Kant : prawo moralne. Warszawa: Amber, 1998. 
 Portuguese translation: Kant: kant e a lei moral. São Paulo Unesp, 1999. 
 Spanish translation by Andrés Lema-Hincapié: Kant y la ley moral. Barcelona: Norma, 1999.

Papers
Journal articles and papers by Ralph Walker can be found at JSTOR and philpapers. See below for a selection of his papers:

 ‘The Status of Kant's Theory of Matter’, Synthese 23:1 (Aug., 1971), pp. 121–126.
 ‘Spinoza and the Coherence Theory of Truth’, Mind 94:373 (Jan., 1985), pp. 1–18.
 ‘Verificationism, Anti-Realism and Idealism’, European Journal of Philosophy 3:3 (1995), pp. 257–272.
 ‘Kant, Duty, and Moral Worth’, International Philosophical Quarterly 42:2 (2002), pp. 265–267.
 ‘Kant on the Number of Worlds, British Journal for the History of Philosophy 18:5 (2011), pp. 821–843.

References

Christian philosophers
Fellows of Magdalen College, Oxford
Living people
British philosophers
Canadian Rhodes Scholars
Kantian philosophers
McGill University alumni
Alumni of Balliol College, Oxford
Fellows of Merton College, Oxford
1944 births